The Sonata in B minor for transverse flute and obbligato harpsichord by Johann Sebastian Bach (BWV 1030) is a sonata in 3 movements:
 Andante
 Largo e dolce 
 Presto

The existing autograph manuscript dates from after 1735, when Bach led the Collegium Musicum in Leipzig. There are errors in the manuscript, and another harpsichord part in G minor that is otherwise the same though transposed, that suggests that this, like the G minor and D major harpsichord concertos, may be among the works Bach transcribed from earlier works originally for other instrumental combinations and in other keys to be playable by performers at hand.

Media

References

External links 
 

Flute sonatas by Johann Sebastian Bach
Trio sonatas
Compositions in B minor